The EMD GP11 is a four-axle diesel locomotive rebuilt by the Illinois Central Railroad's Paducah shops. It is very similar in appearance to the GP8 and GP10.

The Illinois Central Railroad began its GP11 rebuilding program in 1978. All units were rebuilt from recycled EMD GP7, GP9 or GP18 parts. Spotting features are an angled cab, exterior paper air filter, new air intake for the traction motors and four exhaust stacks. Internally they had Dash 2 solid state electrical equipment.

Original buyers
A total of 54 of these remanufactured locomotives were built from April 1978 to 1981. The first prototype unit of this model was numbered 8301.  To avoid confusion the 8700-series was created to separate the GP11s from the GP10s.  It was intended that 8301 would be renumbered 8700 but that never happened. IC units 8701 through 8726 were built in 1979 while units 8727 through 8750 were built in 1980; the remaining three from 8751 to 8753 were built in early 1981.

Core units for the rebuilds came from IC GP9, a lone IC GP18, MBTA GP9, RDG GP7 and UP GP7, GP9 and GP9B.

In Spring 1979, the Clinchfield Railroad sent six GP7s to Paducah to be rebuilt to GP11s. These units were called GP16s by Clinchfield.

Disposition

The majority of Illinois Central's GP11 roster was retired prior to Canadian National's purchase of the railroad, though many of these engines can still be seen in service on other short-line railroads and/or preserved in various locations.

 Illinois Central #8701, the second production GP11 rebuild from the Paducah shops in 1979, is now preserved & sitting on static display outside the passenger station in downtown Carbondale, Illinois.
 Illinois Central #8733, a former GP9 rebuilt in 1980, was donated to the Monticello Railway Museum in Monticello, Illinois, by Canadian National in 2001 where it has since been restored and remains in operational condition.
 Illinois Central #8749, a former EMD GP9 rebuilt in 1980, later went on to other railroads, first SLR 8749, then NREX 8749, SWP 8749, and currently is SWP 2006. Originally built as IC 9314 GP9 in December 1957.
 Illinois Central #8702, built in Paducah shops, now an active locomotive on the Pittsburgh and Ohio Central Railroad.

See also
 List of GM-EMD locomotives

References

External links
 GP11 Photographs Rail Pictures.net
 GP11 Photographs RR Picture Archives.net

Electro-Motive Diesel locomotives
Illinois Central locomotives
B-B locomotives
Diesel-electric locomotives of the United States
Railway locomotives introduced in 1978
Rebuilt locomotives
Standard gauge locomotives of the United States